Central Park Theater may refer to:
Central Park Theater (Chicago, Illinois)
New Century Theatre, a Broadway theatre once known as Central Park Theatre